Alpha Video (also known as Alpha Home Entertainment) is an entertainment company, based near Philadelphia,  that specializes in the manufacturing and marketing of public domain movies and TV shows on DVD.  Alpha Video releases approximately 30 new DVD titles monthly and has over 3,500 DVDs in their active catalog, including hundreds of rare films and TV shows from Hollywood's past.

With 600+ DVDs of TV shows in active distribution, industry publication DVD Release Report  ranks Alpha Video #3 in their ranking of the "Top 20 Sources for TV Series on DVD Through the Period Ending December 31, 2009," behind Warner Home Video (733 releases) and Paramount Home Entertainment (666 releases).  With over 1,461 theatrical releases available, the same publication ranks Alpha Video #2 in the "Top 20 Sources for Theatrical Catalog on DVD," just behind Warner Home Video (1,609 releases).

The company is privately held, and owned by Collectables Records founder Jerry Greene.  Alpha Video is one of a group of companies, including Collectables Records, Gotham Distributing Corporation and the e-commerce website OLDIES.com, owned and operated by Jerry Greene and the Greene family.

Alpha New Cinema
In 2004, Alpha Video introduced Alpha New Cinema, an imprint "whose goal is to present eclectic, interesting and unusual contemporary motion pictures and television productions."  Notables releases from Alpha New Cinema include the Charlie Gracie documentary, Fabulous! An Intimate Portrait of a Rock Pioneer, Mark Redfield's The Death of Poe,  Terror in the Tropics with Bela Lugosi and Boris Karloff, and several films by Ed Wood veteran Conrad Brooks.

Release of Ted V. Mikels' film catalog on DVD
In  2007, Alpha Video released the catalog of filmmaker Ted V. Mikels, many titles of which had previously been available from Image Entertainment, under the Alpha New Cinema imprint.  Titles released include 10 Violent Women, The Doll Squad, The Corpse Grinders, The Corpse Grinders II, Girl in Gold Boots and Blood Orgy of the She Devils.  Later that year, Alpha released the Ted V. Mikel's Signature Collection, a six-DVD box set which contains those six titles and is autographed by Mikels.  In 2008, the company released Mark of the Astro-Zombies, the sequel to Mikels' The Astro-Zombies, on DVD.

Notable releases

The Merv Griffin Show: 40 of The Most Interesting People of Our Time
In 2006, Alpha Video partnered with Merv Griffin to release a 3-DVD box set of interviews from The Merv Griffin Show entitled The Merv Griffin Show: 40 of The Most Interesting People of Our Time.  This set contained one DVD of "Hollywood Legend" interviews, including Orson Welles, Ingrid Bergman, Richard Burton, Sophia Loren, Roy Rogers, Grace Kelly and John Wayne.  The second DVD contained interviews with comedians, including Jack Benny, Don Rickles, Jerry Seinfeld, Carl Reiner, Richard Pryor, George Burns, Jay Leno and George Carlin.  The final DVD in the set contained interviews with "Extraordinary Guests" such as Walter Cronkite, Robert F. Kennedy, Richard Nixon, Gerald R. Ford,  Ronald Reagan and Martin Luther King Jr.

Feature films
Angel and the Badman
Back Door to Heaven
Below the Deadline
The Blood of Jesus (packaged with the film Lying Lips)
Borderline
Bowery Blitzkrieg
Boy! What a Girl!
Boys of the City
The Chase
Cinderella
Clancy Street Boys
Cold Harbor
Condemned to Live
La Cucaracha
Curley (packaged with the film Who Killed Doc Robbin)
The Dark Hour
Devil's Partner
Dixiana 
East Side Kids
Flesh and the Spur
The Flying Deuces
Flying Wild
Ghost Patrol
Ghosts on the Loose
The Girl From Chicago
The Great Flamarion
Half Shot at Sunrise
The Headless Horserman (packaged with the film The Mechanical Man)
Hercules Unchained
High Voltage
Hook, Line, and Sinker 
The Kennel Murder Case
Kid Dynamite
Last Woman on Earth
Let's Get Tough!
Lisa and the Devil
Lying Lips (packaged with the film The Blood of Jesus)
Manos: The Hands of Fate
The Mechanical Man (packaged with the film The Headless Horserman)
Mickey the Great
Million Dollar Kid
Mr. Wise Guy
'Neath Brooklyn Bridge
One Body Too Many
Pride of the Bowery
Raiders of Old California
The Red-Haired Alibi 
The Ring
Ring of Terror
Salt of the Earth
Scarlet Street
Second Chance
The Singing Cowgirl
Smart Alecks
Smash-Up, the Story of a Woman
Something to Sing About
Speak Easily 
Spooks Run Wild
The Student of Prague (1913)
The Student of Prague (1926)
Sweeney Todd: The Demon Barber of Fleet Street (1936)
The Terror of Tiny Town
That Gang of Mine
Time Table 
Tulsa
Utopia
Voyage to the Prehistoric Planet
Voyage to the Planet of Prehistoric Women
A Walk in the Sun
Who Killed Doc Robbin (packaged with the film Curley)
Woman on the Run
Yellowneck

Exploitation films
Assassin of Youth
Chained for Life
Child Bride
The Cocaine Fiends
Marihuana
Reefer Madness
Sex Madness

Movie serials
Ace Drummond
The Devil Horse
The Fighting Marines
Fighting with Kit Carson
Flash Gordon Conquers the Universe
Holt of the Secret Service
Junior G-Men
Junior G-Men of the Air
King of the Wild
The Phantom Empire
Radar Men from the Moon
Sea Raiders
Sky Raiders
Undersea Kingdom
Zorro's Fighting Legion

Short subjects
Along Came Auntie (released as part of Stan Laurel and Oliver Hardy: Early Silent Classics collection)
Bear Shooters (released as part of The Kids of Old Hollywood collection)
Brideless Groom (released as part of The Three Stooges collection)
Bromo and Juliet (released as part of Stan Laurel and Oliver Hardy: Early Silent Classics collection)
Crazy Like a Fox (released as part of Stan Laurel and Oliver Hardy: Early Silent Classics collection)
Disorder in the Court (released as part of The Three Stooges collection)
Enough to Do (released as part of Stan Laurel and Oliver Hardy: Early Silent Classics collection)
The Gay Nighties (released as part of the Lost Comedy Classics collection)
Glad Rags to Riches (released as part of The Kids of Old Hollywood collection)
The Hobo (released as part of Stan Laurel and Oliver Hardy: Early Silent Classics collection)
Hop to It, Bellhop! (released as part of Stan Laurel and Oliver Hardy: Early Silent Classics collection)
Kickin' the Crown Around (released as part of the Lost Comedy Classics collection)
Kid in Hollywood (released as part of The Kids of Old Hollywood collection)
Kid N' Africa (released as part of The Kids of Old Hollywood collection)
Kid Speed (released as part of Stan Laurel and Oliver Hardy: Early Silent Classics collection)
The Lucky Dog (released as part of Stan Laurel and Oliver Hardy: Early Silent Classics collection)
Malice in the Palace (released as part of The Three Stooges collection)
Merrily Yours (released as part of The Kids of Old Hollywood collection)
Mickey's 11 (released as part of Mickey McGuire collection)
Mickey's Medicine Man (released as part of Mickey McGuire collection)
Mickey's Rescue (released as part of Mickey McGuire collection)
Mickey's Touchdown (released as part of Mickey McGuire collection)
Mud and Sand (released as part of Stan Laurel and Oliver Hardy: Early Silent Classics collection)
Oranges and Lemons (released as part of Stan Laurel and Oliver Hardy: Early Silent Classics collection)
Pardon My Pups (released as part of The Kids of Old Hollywood collection)
Polly Trix in Washington (released as part of The Kids of Old Hollywood collection)
The Sawmill (released as part of Stan Laurel and Oliver Hardy: Early Silent Classics collection)
School's Out (released as part of The Kids of Old Hollywood collection)
Short Kilts (released as part of Stan Laurel and Oliver Hardy: Early Silent Classics collection)
Should Sailors Marry? (released as part of Stan Laurel and Oliver Hardy: Early Silent Classics collection)
The Show (released as part of Stan Laurel and Oliver Hardy: Early Silent Classics collection)
Sing a Song of Six Pants (released as part of The Three Stooges collection)
Smithy (released as part of Stan Laurel and Oliver Hardy: Early Silent Classics collection)
The Soilers (released as part of Stan Laurel and Oliver Hardy: Early Silent Classics collection)
The Paper Hanger's Helper (released as part of Stan Laurel and Oliver Hardy: Early Silent Classics collection)
The Stolen Jools (released as part of Stan Laurel and Oliver Hardy: Early Silent Classics collection)
Thundering Fleas (released as part of Stan Laurel and Oliver Hardy: Early Silent Classics collection)
The Tree in a Test Tube (released as part of Stan Laurel and Oliver Hardy: Early Silent Classics collection)
Waldo's Last Stand (released as part of The Kids of Old Hollywood collection)
War Babies (released as part of The Kids of Old Hollywood collection)
West of Hot Dog (released as part of Stan Laurel and Oliver Hardy: Early Silent Classics collection)
What's to Do? (released as part of The Kids of Old Hollywood collection)
White Wings (released as part of Stan Laurel and Oliver Hardy: Early Silent Classics collection)
Yes, Yes, Nanette (released as part of Stan Laurel and Oliver Hardy: Early Silent Classics collection)

Silent films
The Bat
The Birth of a Nation
Broken Blossoms
The General
The Golem
Intolerance
The Lost World
The Mechanical Man
Nosferatu
Oliver Twist
Orphans of the Storm
The Squaw Man
The Thief of Baghdad
Tumbleweeds

Television shows
The Adventures of Champion
The Adventures of Dr. Fu Manchu
The Adventures of Jim Bowie
The Adventures of Long John Silver
The Adventures of Ozzie and Harriet
The Adventures of Robin Hood
The Adventures of Sir Lancelot
Annie Oakley
The Betty Hutton Show
The Beverly Hillbillies
Captain Video and His Video Rangers
Colonel Bleep
Diver Dan
Dragnet
Dusty's Trail
The Ed Wynn Show
Eerie, Indiana
Fury
I Married Joan
The Lone Ranger
The Lucy Show
Mack and Myer for Hire
Martin Kane, Private Eye
Meet Corliss Archer
Mr. and Mrs. North
One Step Beyond
Private Secretary (a.k.a. Susie)
Rocky King, Inside Detective
Sky King
Stump The Stars
Topper
The Veil
Wagon Train
What's My Line?
You Asked For It
You Bet Your Life

References

External links
 Alpha Video's website

Companies based in Philadelphia
Entertainment companies of the United States
DVD companies of the United States
Film distributors of the United States
Privately held companies based in Pennsylvania
Companies based in Conshohocken, Pennsylvania